Diocese of Recife may refer to:

Diocese of Recife, in the Anglican Church in Brazil, affiliated with the Global Fellowship of Confessing Anglicans
Diocese of Recife, in the Anglican Episcopal Church of Brazil, affiliated with the Anglican Communion
Roman Catholic Archdiocese of Olinda and Recife, in northeast Brazil's Pernambuco state